Theodoor Verhaegen (4 June 1700 – 25 July 1759) was an 18th-century Flemish sculptor. His woodcarvings are known for its baroque expression.

Biography
He was born in Mechelen as the son of the sculptor Rombout Verhaegen. He is known for religious works in Mechelen, where he worked with his contemporary, the sculptor Jan Frans Boeckstuyns.
He died in Mechelen.

Selection of carvings
 pulpit of Leliëndaal, now Mechelen Cathedral.
 Pulpit of Our Lady of Hanswijk, Mechelen.
$ interior of Church in Ninove.

References

Theodoor Verhaegen on Artnet

1701 births
1759 deaths
Artists from the Austrian Netherlands
Flemish Baroque sculptors
Artists from Mechelen